Christopher Fearne  (born 12 March 1963) is a Maltese physician and politician. He was appointed Parliamentary Secretary for Health in April 2014 and Minister for Health since April 2016. In July 2017, the Labour Party elected him as Deputy Leader for Parliamentary Affairs, thus assuming the role of Deputy Prime Minister of Malta and Leader of the House.

Education
Fearne received his formal education at St. Aloysius College and at the University of Malta. As a student, Fearne was involved in a number of youth organizations. He served as secretary general of the Maltese Federation of Youth Organisations, officer within the University Students’ Council, KSU, and in the Malta Medical Students' Association.

He qualified in Medicine and Surgery in 1987, becoming a Fellow of The Royal College of Surgeons of Edinburgh. He worked and studied in a number of children's hospitals in England, including Alder Hey Children's Hospital in Liverpool, and Great Ormond Street Hospital in London.

Medical career
Prior to his appointment as Parliamentary Secretary for Health in April 2014, he worked as a Consultant Paediatric Surgeon and Clinical Chairman at Mater Dei Hospital. He is a Member of Parliament for the Labour Party and was the chairman of the Foreign and European Affairs Committee at the Maltese House of Representatives.

Fearne has worked as a doctor and surgeon since 1987. He was also a lecturer in paediatric surgery at the University of Malta and an examiner at its medical school. Fearne is a founding director of the Malta Institute for Medical Education and the chairperson of Celebrities for Kids, a voluntary NGO promoting children's rights.

Political career
Fearne was elected to the House of Representatives in March 2013 following the electoral victory of the Labour Party in that general election. Following a reshuffle in the cabinet in April 2014 by Prime Minister Joseph Muscat, Fearne was appointed Parliamentary Secretary for Health under the office of the Minister for Energy and Health Konrad Mizzi. This was the first position he held as part of the Government of Malta. Fearne was appointed Minister of Health in April 2016.

On 15 July 2017, Fearne was elected as the Deputy Leader for Parliamentary Affairs of the Labour Party, succeeding Louis Grech, and following his election as Deputy Leader for Parliamentary Affairs, Chris Fearne was sworn in as the Deputy Prime Minister of Malta.

Fearne said that the damage done to Malta from the resignations following the case of Daphne Caruana Galizia was almost irreparable.

Following the announcement of the resignation of Joseph Muscat from Prime Minister of Malta and Leader of the Labour party, Fearne was the first Member of Parliament to officially express his intention of contesting for the vacated role. Fearne was endorsed by many fellow MPs. Fearne would run for Leader of the Partit Laburista, a position which would effectively see him sworn as prime minister of Malta.

Minister of Health
On 27 February 2019 Fearne said that abortion was the reason why Malta dropped 10 places in the Public Service Ranking of the Euro health consumer index, although the official report did not match up with this claim.

On 22 April, as Health Minister, Fearne announced the start of a project of €40 million for a new "health hub" in Raħal Ġdid, which would act as a regional medical centre. Fearne explained that the total cost includes €25 million for the infrastructure, and that €33 million are funded by the European Union.

On 14 May 2019 Fearne announced that the Government of Malta would be investing €3 million in cancer treatment. He announced that there would be the introduction of PD-1 inhibitors in the government's formulary at the Oncology Centre at Mater Dei Hospital.

On 12 September 2019 Fearne launched a three-year plan to reinstate health centres in every locality where primary health care would be prioritised. Reportedly, Fearne's Ministry was looking to open a new health centre in Żabbar and refurbish the one in Żejtun by mid-October 2019, and in 2020 the Ministry would open new ones in Valletta, Marsaxlokk and Vittoriosa, refurbish Għaxaq, Santa Luċija and Tarxien and seek for new premises in Kalkara and Ħamrun.

Since 2020, Fearne has also been a member of the Global Leaders Group on Antimicrobial Resistance, co-chaired by prime ministers Sheikh Hasina and Mia Mottley.

Medicine pricing transparency 
Fearne spearheaded the Valletta Declaration initiative. Agreed upon in 2017, during the Maltese Presidency of the Council of the EU, the Valletta Declaration consisted of ten EU Member States: Malta, Italy, Greece, Cyprus, Romania, Spain, Portugal, Croatia, Ireland and Slovenia, and aimed at establishing a technical and political cooperation on cross-border health matters such as anti-microbial resistance and price transparency of innovative medicines.

Speaking to Politico, Fearne said that if "we can go to the industry as a group and say that it’s no longer acceptable to have this secrecy on any negotiating procedure, then the industry will have to take note."

Pharmaceutical companies objected to the Malta-led proposal. At that stage, pharmaceutical companies individually negotiated the supplies of medicines including those medicines deemed to be innovative and which could cure rare diseases. According to Fearne pharma companies are at an advantage position as countries are not in a position to divulge the prices they are paying for the medicines procured. The medicines in question were prohibitively expensive for most national health services and their procurement threatens the sustainability of systems.

According to Fearne, “the model that we will be proposing (...) is that member states which are [providing] funds should aim to go into agreement with the industry to share the benefits when there are new drugs on the market. The industry wants and needs support from member states because it’s evident that industry on its own is not going in for the risk of developing new antibiotics.

While speaking at a Politico Healthcare summit in July 2019, in Amsterdam, Fearne called on his counterparts to push for new rule at European level to share drug prices among Member States. Fearne and the Valletta Declaration group countered the pharmaceutical industry arguments that price transparency leads to higher prices. He was quote saying that “the industry tells us that price transparency would push prices up. Let’s be frank, it’s not true”.

Controversies 
Fearne was criticised by the local media regarding appointments to the Foundation for Medical Services. A party activist, Carmen Ciantar, was given a financial package of €104,000 on her appointment as FMS CEO. 
 Ciantar had close ties  to Fearne, being one of his personal electoral campaign managers. Fearne was alleged to be in a relationship with Ciantar, though these allegations were later withdrawn.

Family
Fearne and his wife Astrid have three children: Dawn, Julian, and Rafael.

References

External links
Hon. Christopher Fearne MP - Parliamentary Secretary for Health – Parliament of Malta

|-

University of Malta alumni
Labour Party (Malta) politicians
Living people
Maltese paediatricians
Members of the House of Representatives of Malta
Academic staff of the University of Malta
1963 births
People from Attard
Deputy Prime Ministers of Malta
Government ministers of Malta
21st-century Maltese physicians
20th-century Maltese physicians
21st-century Maltese politicians